The Klamath Basin Restoration Agreement (KBRA) is an American multi-party legal agreement determining river usage and water rights involving the Klamath River and Klamath Basin in the states of California and Oregon. Discussion of the KBRA began in 2005. Congress failed to pass legislation that would implement the KBRA by the January 1, 2016 deadline.

Parties to the agreement included the state of California, the state of Oregon, the Karuk Tribe, the Klamath Tribes, the Yurok Tribe, Del Norte County, California, Humboldt County, California, Klamath County, Oregon, Siskiyou County, California; 26 private individuals, companies, and local irrigation districts; and seven NGOs including California Trout and Trout Unlimited.

History

Background
The idea behind the document originally stemmed from the 2001 irrigation water shutoff to Klamath Project farmers, when water was withheld from the irrigators in favor of the threatened coho salmon and the endangered Lost River Sucker.  Downstream populations of coho salmon are within the Southern Oregon/Northern California Evolutionary Significant Unit and are listed as threatened (2011).

That summer, a symbolic bucket brigade was held, where nearly 20,000 people passed 50 buckets of water, one for each state, from Upper Klamath Lake to the A canal that supplies water to the Klamath Project.

Development
Talks commenced in 2005; a draft was proposed by 2009.

The Klamath Basin Restoration Agreement (KBRA) is a document that aims to: 
 help restore Riparian Zones along much of the rivers in the Klamath Basin
 remove 4 Hydroelectric dams on the Klamath River with the goal of salmon restoration
 provides irrigation water assurances for Klamath Basin farmers
 provides the Klamath Tribes with the 90,000 acre Mazama Tree Farm

Signing 
The final document was signed on February 18, 2010 in Salem, Oregon. Among the more notable signatories to the agreement was the Governor of California, Arnold Schwarzenegger, the Governor of Oregon, Ted Kulongoski,  and the Chairman of the Klamath Tribes, Joseph Kirk.

Congress failed to pass legislation that would implement the KBRA by the January 1, 2016 deadline. A new agreement, the Klamath Hydroelectric Settlement Agreement (KHSA) was signed on April 6, 2016 which planned to remove four hydroelectric dams (the Copco 1, Copco 2, J.C. Boyle, and Iron Gate) by 2020.

Further reading 

 McCool, D. (2018). Integrated Water Resources Management and Collaboration: The Failure of the Klamath River Agreements. Journal of Policy History, 30(1), 83-104.

Footnotes

External links 
 The KBRA Document as signed on February 18, 2010
 Klamath Restoration website
 The Klamath Hydroelectric Settlement Agreement

Klamath River
Salmon restoration
Water management authorities in the United States
Watersheds of the West Coast (U.S.)
2010 in California
2010 in Oregon
Water in California
Water in Oregon
Del Norte County, California
Humboldt County, California
Klamath
Klamath County, Oregon
2010 establishments in California
2010 establishments in Oregon
2010 in the United States
Agreements
2010 documents